Andreas Helgstrand (born 2 October 1977) is a Danish dressage rider. He won four consecutive Danish dressage championships, from 2005 through 2008.

Biography
Andreas Helgstrand was born in 1977 to Ulf Helgstrand and his wife. His father became president of the Danish Equestrian Federation. Andreas started competitive riding aged 7 or 8, competing initially in showjumping.  At the age of 17, he started training as a riding master in 1994 at the Sport Riding Club in Aalborg. He passed the final exams in 2000. 

He has since worked as a horse trainer, riding instructor, and horse trader; first in the Netherlands with Anne van Olst, then in Kongsberg in Norway, before replacing Lars Petersen at the Blue Hors stud in Randboel, Denmark. At the 2004 Olympics, riding Cavan, Helgstrand came in ninth in the individual and fifth in the team. He finished fourth in the 2004 poll for Danish sportsperson of the year.

At the 2006 World Equestrian Games, riding the mare Matiné, Helgstrand came in second in the Individual freestyle and third in the individual special. Eurodressage's report of the tournament called him "the favourite of the crowd" and said he "seemed to have redefined piaffe and passage". A video of this performance (to the hip-hop song "No Mo" by Red Astaire) has circulated widely on YouTube, being seen over 5 million times.

Helgstrand withdrew from the 2007 Dressage World Cup finals in Las Vegas when Matiné twisted her left front pastern on arrival while getting out of the van. She was retired from competition in the months afterward, as she was unable to recover from the injury. In 2010 she was euthanised after breaking a leg in the pasture.

In 2008, Helgstrand won his fourth consecutive Danish dressage championship, on his fourth horse (Don Schufro, after Cavan, Matiné and Casmir). At the 2008 Olympics, riding Don Schufro, he came in eleventh in the individual and third in the team. 

At the end of 2008 Helgstrand left the Blue Hors stud to start his own business, which he named Helgstrand Dressage, at Møgelmosegård near Aalborg.

In 2010 Helgstrand rode Uno Donna Unique to victory in the 6-year-old class at the 2010 World Championships for Young Dressage Horses. In 2013 Helgstrand became embroiled in a dispute regarding the sale of Uno Donna Unique. In the same year, he came under extensive media fire regarding controversial photographs taken of him riding his horse in the disputed rollkur technique.

Helgstrand was shortlisted for the Danish dressage team for the 2012 Olympics, but was not selected.

In April 2014 Helgstrand was under scrutiny for animal cruelty due to alleged harsh, illegal and cruel training methods. The Danish animal protection service summoned him for a meeting. Several of the big Danish newspapers were running stories with photographs from a recent event where his horse Foldagers Akeem was bleeding and had a blue tongue.  On 28 November 2014 the court in Aalborg announced an acquittal verdict in the case against Helgstrand, acquitting him of all charges. ”I am very happy about the  ruling of the court; it is important for me personally, but also for the sport in general. It has been quite tough to have these accusations hovering, but my family and I are now focusing on the future instead," said Helgstrand.

Notable Horses 

 Blue Hors Cavan - 1990 Bay Hanoverian Gelding (Cavalier x Damnatz)
 2004 Athens Olympics - Team Fifth Place, Individual Ninth Place
 2005 FEI World Cup Final - Fifth Place
 2005 European Championships - Team Sixth Place, Individual Ninth Place
 Blue Hors Matine - 1997 Gray Danish Warmblood Mare (Silvermoon x Matador)
 2006 World Equestrian Games - Team Fourth Place, Individual Bronze Medal, Individual Silver Medal Freestyle
 Gredstedgards Casmir - 1999 Dark Bay Danish Warmblood Gelding (Continue x Rastell)
 2007 European Championships - Team Sixth Place, Individual 13th Place, Individual Ninth Place Freestyle
 2008 FEI World Cup Final - Seventh Place
 Blue Hors Don Schufro - 1993 Chestnut Oldenburg Stallion (Donnerhall)
 2008 Beijing Olympics - Team Bronze Medal, Individual Tenth Place
 Carabas - 1998 Dark Bay Holsteiner Stallion (Carnaby x Roberto)
 2009 European Championships - Team Fifth Place, Individual 29th Place
 Akeem Foldager - 2002 Bay Danish Warmblood Gelding (Akinos x Loran)
 2013 European Championships - Team Fourth Place, Individual 23rd Place
 Ferrari OLD - 2012 Dark Bay Oldenburg Stallion (Foundation 2 x Blue Hors Hotline)
 2017 FEI Dressage Young Horse World Championships - Silver Medal
 Springbank VH - 2010 Chestnut Swedish Warmblood Gelding (Skovens Rafael x De Niro)
 2017 FEI Dressage Young Horse World Championships - 14th Place

References

External links
 Helgstrand Dressage official website

Danish dressage riders
Living people
1977 births
Danish male equestrians
Olympic equestrians of Denmark
Equestrians at the 2004 Summer Olympics
Equestrians at the 2008 Summer Olympics
Olympic bronze medalists for Denmark
Olympic medalists in equestrian
Medalists at the 2008 Summer Olympics